Sport in New Zealand largely reflects the nation's colonial heritage, with some of the most popular sports being rugby union, rugby league, cricket, association football, basketball, horse racing and netball, which are primarily played in Commonwealth countries. New Zealand has enjoyed success in many sports, notably rugby union (considered the national sport), rugby league, cricket, America's Cup sailing, world championship and Olympics events, and motorsport.

Other popular sports include squash, golf, hockey, tennis, cycling, and tramping, baseball and a variety of water sports, particularly sailing rowing, and surf sports. Winter sports such as skiing and snowboarding are also popular, as are indoor and outdoor bowls.

Administration
Sport New Zealand is the main government agency responsible for governing sport and recreation in New Zealand. It was established in 2003 by the Sport and Recreation New Zealand Act 2002, consolidating three agencies into one, and was known as Sport and Recreation New Zealand (SPARC) until February 2012. Sport New Zealand is accountable to the government through the Minister of Sport and Recreation. A subsidiary of Sport New Zealand, High Performance Sport New Zealand (HPSNZ), is responsible for managing the country's high performance programme.

Participation

The New Zealand Secondary School Sports Council (NZSSSC) runs an annual census of sport participation amongst secondary school students (age 13 to 18). The data only includes students that had a "meaningful engagement" in the sport, e.g. representing their school in a team.

Major sports

Rugby union 

Rugby union is the national sport in New Zealand. It has the largest spectator following of all sports in New Zealand. New Zealand's national rugby team, the All Blacks, has the best winning record of any national team in the world, and is currently ranked third in the world. The All Blacks won the first Rugby World Cup in 1987, and again on home soil in 2011. They won their third World Cup in 2015 in England, becoming the first holders to successfully defend their title. The All Blacks traditionally perform a haka, a Māori challenge, at the start of international matches. This practice has been mimicked by several other national teams, notably the national rugby league team, and the basketball teams.

Outside Test matches, there are three widely followed competitions:
 Super Rugby (previously Super 6, Super 10, Super 12, and Super 14), the elite club competition in the southern hemisphere. It has involved teams from New Zealand, Australia and South Africa since its formation, and in 2016 added teams in Argentina and Japan (with the Japan team also playing select "home" matches in Singapore). It is played from summer right through until winter (February to August), with a 3-week break in June for international tests to take place.
 Mitre 10 Cup (previously Air New Zealand Cup and ITM Cup), created in 2006 as a successor to the National Provincial Championship (NPC), involves semi-professional provincial New Zealand teams and is played mainly during the Winter and spring months, from August to November.
 Heartland Championship, an amateur competition of lower-level New Zealand provincial teams, also created in 2006 as a successor to the NPC and is also played in the winter and spring months, from August to November.

In the sevens variant of rugby union, the men's national team has been the main force in the sport since the creation of the World Rugby Sevens Series in 1999, winning the World Series 12 times in its 16 seasons. They have also won the Rugby World Cup Sevens thrice, in 2001, 2013 and the most recent edition in 2018, and won the first four gold medals awarded in sevens at the Commonwealth Games (1998–2010). The country also hosts one round of the World Series each season at Westpac Stadium in Wellington. In women's sevens, the national team is about as dominant as the men; they won the first three editions of the World Rugby Women's Sevens Series (2013–2015) and are the current holders of the Rugby World Cup Sevens, winning the women's tournaments in 2013 and 2018. New Zealand will host the 2021 Women's Rugby World Cup it will be the first ever Women's Rugby World Cup to be held in the southern hemisphere.

Cricket 

Cricket is the national summer sport and the second most popular sport in New Zealand, which is one of twelve countries competing in Test match cricket. The provincial competition is not nearly as widely followed as rugby, but international matches are watched with interest by a large portion of the population. This parallels the global situation in cricket, whereby the international game is more widely followed than the domestic game in all major cricketing countries.

Historically, the national cricket team has not been as successful as the national rugby team. New Zealand played its first Test in 1930, but had to wait until 1956 until its first Test victory. The national team began to have more success in the 1970s and 1980s. New Zealand's most famous cricketer, the fast bowler Richard Hadlee who was the first bowler to take 400 wickets in test cricket, played in this era.

New Zealand has traditionally been stronger in one-day cricket, having reached the final of both the 2015 and 2019, beating South Africa and India in the semi-finals but ultimately losing to Australia and England in the final. (They tied the match in 2019 but lost on boundary countback).
The team also won the 2000 edition of the ICC Champions Trophy and reached the 2009 final, and won the bronze medal at the 1998 Commonwealth Games. 

Martin Crowe and Kane Williamson won the prestigious 'Player of the Tournament' award in the 1992 Cricket World Cup and 2019 Cricket World Cup respectively. Geoff Allott was the highest wicket taker in the 1999 Cricket World Cup along with Shane Warne. Fast bowler Kyle Mills is the highest wicket taker in ICC Champions Trophy matches. Martin Guptill was the highest run-scorer in the 2015 Cricket World Cup and even broke the record of the highest score in World Cup matches during his knock of 237 against West Indies in the quarter-final. Trent Boult was the highest wicket taker in the 2015 Cricket World Cup along with Mitchell Starc. Kyle Jamieson was the Player of the Match in the 2019–2021 ICC World Test Championship final.

In Twenty20 cricket, New Zealand has twice reached the semi-finals of the ICC T20 World Cup, doing so in 2007 and 2016, and has reached the final in 2021 ICC Men's T20 World Cup by defeating England in the semi-final. Many New Zealand cricketers regularly feature in T20 leagues around the globe every year.

In June 2021, they beat India in the ICC World Test Championship Final in Southampton to become the inaugural World Test champions. They were hence ranked the number one Test team in the world. New Zealand has won two multinational ICC tournaments- 2000 edition(now referred to as ICC Champions Trophy) under Stephen Fleming and ICC World Test Championship under Kane Williamson.

New Zealand's Women's Team, the White Ferns have reached the final of their World Cup four times, winning the 2000 edition of the tournament.

There is also a London New Zealand Cricket Club based in London, England, for New Zealanders living in or based in the United Kingdom.

Netball 

Netball is the most popular women's sport, both in terms of participation and public interest in New Zealand. As in many netball-playing countries, netball is considered primarily a women's sport, with men's netball largely ancillary to women's competition. The sport maintains a high profile in New Zealand, due in large part to its national team, the Silver Ferns, which with Australia, has remained at the forefront of world netball for several decades. In 2008, netball in New Zealand became a semi-professional sport with the introduction of the trans-Tasman ANZ Championship. The sport is administered by Netball New Zealand, which registered 125,500 players in 2006.

Rugby league 

Unlike Australia, where rugby league is the dominant rugby code, rugby union is the more popular code in New Zealand. The New Zealand domestic league is semi-professional and enjoyed by many great sports fan. However, the Australian National Rugby League (NRL), in which New Zealand Warriors play, is hugely popular overtaking rugby. .
The New Zealand national side has competed in the Rugby League World Cup since 1954. They were the previous World Champions, winning the World Cup for the first time on 22 November 2008 at Lang Park, Brisbane. The team also reached the 2013 Rugby League World Cup (hosted by England and Wales) final on Saturday 30 October 2013. They lost to Australia in the final, 34–2. The team's most recent title came in the 2014 Rugby League Four Nations tournament by beating Australia, which brings their Rugby League Four Nations championships total to two.

Association football 

Football has always been a significant sport in New Zealand, and was introduced by the first English settlers. It is considered the regional sport of Greater Wellington, which in turn is the only region in New Zealand not to have rugby as the most popular sport. This is exemplified by Wellington having New Zealand's only major professional side, the Wellington Phoenix, which plays in the Australian A-League. Football's greater regional popularity has been due to extensive support among the city's half a million people, especially since inner city clubs were formed immigration from Europe and the Middle East in the postwar period. These clubs were often ethnically based, including Wellington Olympic AFC (Greek), Wellington United (Dutch and Hungarian), and Island Bay United (Italian). The Miramar Rangers have often been considered Wellington's local powerhouse. Several Wellington Phoenix players have gone on to have major success overseas, such as Sarpreet Singh, Roy Krishna, Marco Rojas and Liberato Cacace. Wynton Rufer, considered the country's greatest ever footballer, was born and raised in Wellington.

Nationally, the sport is administered by New Zealand Football, which changed its name from "New Zealand Soccer" in 2007 to move in line with common usage around the world. Use of term "football" to refer to the sport is increasingly favoured by news sources and publications.

The New Zealand national team, nicknamed the "All Whites", has qualified for the FIFA World Cup twice. At their first appearance in 1982, the All Whites were knocked out in the first round with three losses. Their next appearance in 2010 saw another first-round exit, but with considerably more success on the field; the All Whites earned three draws, including a 1–1 result against defending champion Italy, ending up as the only team that was not beaten in this edition. The country's only professional football team, Wellington Phoenix FC, plays in the A-League which is otherwise an all-Australian competition.  The two major domestic competitions are the New Zealand Football Championship, which is played between eight regional teams, and the Chatham Cup which is a knock-out competition played between clubs. Neither the Phoenix nor the NZFC franchises play in the Chatham Cup.

Auckland City FC won the semi-professional OFC Champions League competition in a record eight times; 2006, 2009, 2011, 2012, 2013, 2014, 2015 and 2016, and earned the bronze medal at the 2014 FIFA Club World Cup held in Morocco. Nowadays, the Navy Blues are looking into the possibility of joining the A-League as the second New Zealand team after the Wellington Phoenix.

Football is especially popular amongst young people. In 2017, football was played by 25,037 secondary school students, making it the fourth-most popular sport behind netball, rugby union and basketball.

New Zealand hosted the 1999 FIFA U-17 World Cup, the inaugural FIFA U-17 Women's World Cup in 2008 and the 2015 FIFA U-20 World Cup and will co-host the 2023 FIFA Women's World Cup alongside Australia.

Other Sports

Thoroughbred horse running

The various Cup days in the major cities attract large crowds, the biggest ones being Auckland Cup week and the Wellington Cup festival. Horses often travel to Australia and vice versa for racing and breeding purposes. The world-famous Phar Lap and many Melbourne Cup winners were bred in New Zealand. Thoroughbred racing is the most prominent type of horse racing in New Zealand, although there is still a strong following of Standardbred harness racing (or "trotters" and "pacers" as they are sometimes known).

Athletics (track and field)

Athletics is New Zealand's second-most successful Olympic sport with 24 medals, of which 10 have been gold. Arthur Porritt was New Zealand's first Olympic athletic medallist, winning bronze in the 100 metres at the 1924 Summer Olympics. The race was later immortallised in the 1981 film Chariots of Fire, although at Porritt's request his character in the film was renamed "Tom Watson".

The nation in particular has been strong in middle-distance events. New Zealand men have won Olympic gold in the 1500 metres three times: Jack Lovelock in 1936, Peter Snell in 1964 and John Walker in 1976. Snell also won back-to-back gold medals in the 800 metres in 1960 and 1964.

The national governing body is Athletics New Zealand, which formed in 1887 as the New Zealand Amateur Athletics Association and adopted its current name in 1989.

Australian rules football 

Australian rules football is a growing sport in New Zealand with programs established under the reorganised governing body of AFL New Zealand. Australian rules football was previously much more popular in New Zealand, with a team competing at the 1908 Melbourne Carnival. Participation dropped after World War I. The game was re-established in New Zealand in the 1970s.

Leagues currently exist in Auckland, Canterbury, Waikato, and Wellington. The national team won the Australian Football International Cup in 2005.

New Zealanders who have played in the Australian Football League, the premier Australian rules football competition, include Joe Sellwood, Wayne Schwass, Thomas O'Halloran, Danny Dickfos, Trent Croad and Karmichael Hunt.

American football
American football is a small sport in New Zealand with programs established in Auckland, Waikato, Hawkes Bay and Wellington. The governing body is the New Zealand American Football Federation.

The New Zealand national team is called the New Zealand Steelblacks.

Baseball

The Auckland Tuatara of the Australian Baseball League are currently the only professional baseball team playing in New Zealand. The Tuatara began their inaugural season during the 2018–19 Australian Baseball League season, and originally played their home games at McLeod Park in Te Atatū South. For their second season, they moved their home games to North Harbour Stadium in Albany, New Zealand.

The New Zealand national baseball team are known as The Diamondblacks.

Basketball

The Auckland-based New Zealand Breakers are the only New Zealand-based team in the National Basketball League of Australia. Four players from New Zealand have gone on to play in the NBA: Steven Adams, Aron Baynes, Sean Marks, and Kirk Penney.

On the international stage, the Tall Blacks (New Zealand's national team) came in 4th place at the 2002 FIBA World Championship.

Beach volleyball 
Beach volleyball is a growing sport in New Zealand. In 1996 brothers Glenn and Reid Hamilton represented New Zealand in the first ever beach volleyball event at the Summer Olympics at Atlanta, USA. In 2012 Kirk Pitman and Jason Lockhead reached 20th in the world rankings. Anna Harrison (née Scarlett) and Susan Blundell were the highest ranking female pairing reaching 33rd in the world rankings.

In 2018 Beach Volleyball made its Commonwealth Games debut. Tauranga brothers Sam and Ben O'Dea claimed the bronze medal while Shaunna Polley and Kelsie Will gained 5th place.

The national governing body is Volleyball New Zealand.

Equestrian
Equestrian sportsmen, sportswomen and horses make their mark in the world, with Mark Todd being chosen international "Horseman of the Twentieth Century", and many juniors at Pony Club level. Mark Todd won a gold medal in eventing at the 1984 Olympic Games, and again at the 1988 Games. He won Bronze at the 2012 London games. A Bronze Medal was also won in the Teams Event at the 1988 Games. Further medals were won at the 1992, 1996, and 2000 Games.

Boxing 
Amateur boxing was earlier a popular sport in New Zealand, but during the 1950s there was a move to stop schools promoting boxing championships and the sport is now only of minority interest. Despite this there has been success at Commonwealth and Olympic Games level.

Professional boxing in New Zealand has produced Joseph Parker, Geovana Peres, Daniella Smith, Maselino Masoe, Bob Fitzsimmons and Torpedo Billy Murphy, Cherneka Johnson all World Champions. Herbert Slade, David Tua, Kali Meehan, Lani Daniels, Michelle Preston and Tom Heeney were all contenders for a World Championship.

Canoeing 
New Zealand enjoyed success in canoeing and kayaking at the Summer Olympics in the 1980s with sprint kayakers such as Ian Ferguson and Paul MacDonald, winning four gold medals at the 1984 Los Angeles games, and gold, silver and bronze at the 1988 Seoul games. The sport had a lower profile in the 1990s and 2000s, with the single Olympic medal success in the time being Ben Fouhy's silver medal at the 2004 Athens games. In the early 2010s, canoeing and kayaking returned to international success with sprint kayaker Lisa Carrington winning multiple gold medals at the World Championships and Olympic Games.

Cycling 

New Zealand has produced a number of notable cyclists, across a variety of disciplines including track cycling, road cycling, mountain biking, Downhill and BMX. New Zealand won two cycling medals at the 2008 Beijing Olympics – Hayden Roulston took silver in the Men's 4000 m Individual Pursuit, while the men's team pursuit team took bronze. At the 2017 UCI Track Cycling World Championships, the New Zealand team took a total of five medals, equalling the country's record medal tally previously achieved at the 2012 and 2014 Worlds, with Ethan Mitchell, Sam Webster and Eddie Dawkins winning the gold in the men's team sprint for the third time in four years and Mitchell additionally becoming the first New Zealander to medal in the individual sprint. In road racing, George Bennett became the first New Zealander to take an overall win in a UCI WorldTour event when he won the 2017 Tour of California. New Zealand is famous in Downhill Racing too; riders as Sam Blenkinsop, Brook McDonald, Nathan Rankin and Wyn Masters are some of the fastest downhill racers in the world. The sport is governed in New Zealand by Cycling New Zealand.

Extreme sports 
Extreme sports are increasingly popular in New Zealand, both with residents and tourists. Bungee jumping and zorbing were both invented in New Zealand.

Futsal 
The New Zealand national futsal team, nicknamed the Futsal Whites, is the representative side for New Zealand in international futsal and is governed by New Zealand Football (NZF). New Zealand made the bid for the 2020 FIFA Futsal World Cup but lost out to Lithuania.

Gliding 
New Zealand hosted the 1995 World Gliding Championships at Omarama in North Otago, near the centre of the South Island. The Southern Alps are known for the excellent wave soaring conditions. In 2002 and 2003, Steve Fossett tried to beat the world gliding altitude record there (see: Gliding New Zealand and external links below).

Golf 
New Zealand's Michael Campbell won the 2005 U.S. Open Golf Championship.

The New Zealand amateur team of Campbell, Phil Tataurangi, Steven Scahill and Grant Moorehead won the Eisenhower Trophy (World Amateur team event) in 1992 in Vancouver.

Sir Bob Charles has won the British Open and a number of other titles.

Lydia Ko, born in Seoul but raised from infancy in New Zealand, was #1 in the women's World Amateur Golf Ranking, and won two events on the US-based LPGA Tour before turning professional in 2013. She has since won seven more LPGA events, and for a time was #1 in the Women's World Golf Rankings for professionals. The first of Ko's two stints as #1 in the professional rankings began in February 2015, before her 18th birthday, making her the youngest player of either sex to reach the top of the world rankings. Later in 2015, Ko won her first major championship, the Evian Championship, becoming the youngest player of either sex to win a professional major championship, and became the youngest-ever LPGA Player of the Year.

Tournaments and competitions include New Zealand Open, New Zealand Women's Open, New Zealand Amateur and New Zealand PGA Championship.

Hockey 
In New Zealand, like most other Commonwealth nations, "hockey" without an identifier refers to field hockey, as opposed to ice hockey and other kinds of hockey. The New Zealand Hockey Federation (also known as Hockey New Zealand) administers the sport in New Zealand, and had 48,174 registered players in the 2013 winter, of which 52.8 percent were female and 47.2 percent were male.

The New Zealand men's national team and women's national team are both known as the "Black Sticks". The best result attained thus far by the men was a gold medal at the 1976 Summer Olympics in Montreal. The best placing by the women thus far has been a 4th placing at both the 1986 Women's Hockey World Cup and the 2012 Summer Olympics.  In the Commonwealth Games they have won a silver medal at the 2010 Commonwealth Games, bronze at the 2014 Commonwealth Games, and gold at the 2018 Commonwealth Games. , the men's team is ranked 8th and the women's team is ranked 4th in the world by the International Hockey Federation (FIH).

Ice hockey 
Ice hockey has been played in New Zealand since 1937, but is a fairly small sport and has currently around 1600 active players.

The national governing body is New Zealand Ice Hockey Federation which is made up of 3 Regional Associations. Since 2005 the NZIHF organizes the New Zealand Ice Hockey League that currently consists of five teams, two teams from Auckland, one from Dunedin, one from Queenstown and one from Christchurch.

New Zealand's men's national ice hockey team is called the Ice Blacks and the women's the Ice Ferns.

Indoor Bowls
New Zealand Indoor Bowls was introduced in 1908 and today is made up of 37 centres and 767 clubs covering all of New Zealand. Membership peaked in 1963 with 73,100 affiliated members, today it has an estimated 20,000 members currently affiliated. Many members are attracted to the sport due to the competitiveness and skill required to successfully compete with being named as an interprovincial representative being a goal of most players.

Kabaddi
New Zealand has a small but growing kabaddi following. The men's national team took part in the 2012 Kabaddi World Cup, and the women's team surprisingly reached the final on debut in the Women's 2013 World Cup, a feat which they repeated in 2014. The sport is run in New Zealand by the New Zealand Kabaddi Sports Federation.

Kickboxing 
Kickboxing is a growing sport in New Zealand. New Zealand have had multiple world champions including Ray Sefo, Mark Hunt, Israel Adesanya, Michelle Preston and many more.

King in the Ring in a regular eight-man kickboxing tournament that happens between three and five times a year in New Zealand.

Kī-o-rahi 
Kī-o-rahi is a traditional Māori ball sport played in New Zealand with a small round ball called a ki. It is a fast-paced sport incorporating skills similar to Australian Rules, rugby union, netball and touch. In 2005 Ki-o-rahi was chosen to represent New Zealand by global fast-food chain McDonald's as part of its 'Passport to Play' programme to teach physical play activities in 31,000 American schools. The New Zealand Ki-o-rahi representative organisation, Ki-o-Rahi Akotanga Iho, formed with men's and women's national teams, completed a 14 match tour of Europe in September and October 2010.

Motorsport 

Despite New Zealand not having a major car industry since the 1990s, it is very successful at motorsport.  There are many levels of competitive motors sport series in New Zealand, which are most simply broken down into watersports (hydro-planing, jetski racing and thundercat racing), automobile racing (Club and national level circuit racing and rallying, with some international events, as well as speedway) and finally motorcycle racing (street, circuit and dirt/motocross).

To date, New Zealand has seen one Formula One World Champion, Denny Hulme, in 1967. Five other New Zealanders have raced at Grand Prix level: Bruce McLaren (four wins), Chris Amon, Howden Ganley, Mike Thackwell and Brendon Hartley. Bruce McLaren founded the McLaren racing team, which was named after him.

In addition to their Formula One careers, Chris Amon and Bruce McLaren won the 1966 24 Hours of Le Mans sports-car race. Earl Bamber won the 2015 24 Hours of Le Mans, and won again in 2017 with fellow kiwi Brendon Hartley. Bruce McLaren and Denny Hulme won four Can-Am sports-car racing championships, from 1967 to 1970. Scott Dixon won the Indianapolis 500 in 2008, and the IndyCar Series championship in 2003, 2008, 2013, 2015, 2018 and 2020. Dixon has won 53 races to date in his IndyCar career, the second most after American driver A. J. Foyt.

New Zealand has many drivers currently competing on a high level on the world stage: Scott McLaughlin, Shane van Gisbergen and Fabian Coulthard are among several New Zealand drivers who have contested the Australian-based Supercars Championship, which holds a round in New Zealand each year, currently at the Pukekohe circuit. Greg Murphy has won the pinnacle race of the Supercar season, the Bathurst 1000, four times. Brendon Hartley won the FIA World Endurance Championship in 2015. Two New Zealanders currently compete in the American IndyCar Series: Scott McLaughlin for Team Penske, and Scott Dixon for Chip Ganassi Racing.

A1 Team New Zealand was a front-runner since the series inception. Jonny Reid won seven races for the team helping it twice claim second place in the Championship, 2006–07 & 2007–08. On 20 January 2008, Taupo Motorsport Park hosted the fifth race in the 2007–08 A1 Grand Prix season.

Rallying is a popular sport at all levels in New Zealand, and has previously hosted rounds of the World Rally Championship (the last time being in 2012) and hosts the Asia-Pacific Rally Championship each year. A highly competitive national championship is run each year, and some drivers also take part in the Australian Rally Championship, most notably the late Possum Bourne, who was a seven-times Australian Rally Champion. Hayden Paddon is New Zealand's top rally driver competing in the World Rally Championship for Hyundai.

Ivan Mauger, born in Christchurch on 4 October 1939, won a record 6 motorcycle speedway World Championships in 1968, 1969, 1970, 1972, 1977 and 1979. He also finished on the podium of the World Final in 1967 (3rd), 1971 (2nd), 1973 (2nd) and 1974 (2nd). Mauger also won the Speedway World Team Cup riding for Great Britain in 1968, 1971 and 1972, while winning the title for a fourth time with the New Zealand team in 1979. Mauger was also the Speedway World Pairs Champion in 1969 and 1970 as well as the Long Track World Champion in 1971, 1972 and 1976, a total of 15 World Championships in speedway racing. With his Long Track title in 1971 he also became the first rider to have won all four World Championship competitions, while winning in 1972 saw him become the first rider to win both the Speedway and Long Track World Championships in the same year. In 1999, Ivan Mauger was voted the best speedway rider of the Millennium by the readers of Speedway Star and Vintage Speedway magazines.

Barry Briggs, born in Christchurch on 30 December 1934, is a New Zealand motorcyclist who won four individual Speedway World Championships (1957, 1958, 1964 and 1966) and took part in a record 87 world championship races. Briggs also won the Speedway World Team cup with Great Britain in 1968 and 1971. Between 1954 and 1970, Briggs appeared in a record 17 consecutive World Individual Finals.

Ronnie Moore became New Zealand's first motorsport World Champion when he won the 1954 Speedway World Championship, backing that up to win a second time in 1959. Moore also won the World Pairs Championship with Ivan Mauger in 1970. Although born in Hobart, Australia in 1933, Moore's parents moved to New Zealand while he was still a child and he always considered himself to be a Kiwi and rode under the New Zealand flag.

Since then Graeme Crosby and Aaron Slight have both risen to the top of World Championship motorcycle racing, in 500cc and Superbikes respectively but championships have been elusive. Also John Britten designed a revolutionary motorcycle called the Britten V1000. Shayne King became the first rider from New Zealand to win the 500cc Motocross World Championship in 1996. Stefan Merriman is a four-time winner of the World Enduro Championship for enduro motorcycling.

In 2003 Wade Cunningham become New Zealand's first ever Fédération Internationale de l'Automobile world champion by winning the Karting World Championship. Cunningham later raced in the US Indy car series.

Orienteering 
Orienteering is a popular sport in New Zealand, that combines cross-country running with land navigation skills across a range of settings. Variations of the sport popular in New Zealand include bicycle orienteering, ski orienteering, and rogaines. Orienteering is a popular sport for youth and juniors, and New Zealand regularly sends competitors to both the World Orienteering Championships and the Junior World Orienteering Championships. Orienteering in New Zealand is organized by the New Zealand Orienteering Federation. Matt Ogden won the middle-distance event at the 2012 Junior World Orienteering Championships in Slovakia.

Rowing 

Rowing has been a consistent medal winner at the Olympic Games with the first coming in 1920. New Zealand have won medals at every Olympics between 1968 and 2016, with the exception of 1980.

At the World Rowing Championships of 2005, in Kaizu, Gifu, Japan, New Zealand won 4 gold medals in 4 consecutive races – now known as the "Magic 45 minutes".

In 2006, Nathan Cohen became the first New Zealander to win a gold medal at the World University Games in any sport, rowing a single scull.

In addition a number of Rowing World Cup events have been won by New Zealanders. Rowing New Zealand is the governing body.

Lake Karapiro in the Waikato and Lake Ruataniwha in the Mackenzie Basin are the two premier rowing venues in New Zealand. Karapiro hosted the 2010 World Rowing Championships.

Sailing 

New Zealand sailors have won a large number of international events, including Olympic Games medals in 1956, 1964, 1984, 1988, 1992, 1996, 2000, 2008, 2012 and 2016. New Zealand holds the  America's Cup sailing title, having won it three times in the challenge's history.

Surf lifesaving (surf sports) 
In New Zealand, surf lifesaving sport encompasses a number of different disciplines, including surf swimming, board paddling, surf ski, beach flags, beach sprint, Ironman with competitors starting from the age of 7. Surf lifesaving is a relatively popular minor sport with and estimated 8,000 competitors of which 2,500 attend Ocean Athletes (Junior Nationals 10–14) and Nats (Senior nationals). The New Zealand team also known as the Black Fins have also been highly successful in recent years placing 2nd in the 2010 World Championships and are currently the only country apart from Australia to have won World Champs, (1956, 1998, 2012, 2014, 2016) which is respectable considering the comparatively small size of the sport in the country.

America's Cup 
Auckland hosted consecutive America's Cup regattas in 2000 and 2003. In 2000, Team New Zealand successfully defended the trophy they won in 1995 in San Diego, but in 2003 they lost to a team headed by Ernesto Bertarelli of Switzerland whose Alinghi was skippered by Russell Coutts, the expatriate Kiwi who helmed the victorious Black Magic in 1995 and New Zealand in 2000 as well as many other Kiwis. Coutts and Brad Butterworth, along with several other Team New Zealand members, defected to Bertarelli's Alinghi team, taking with them a wealth of experience that allowed the new team to win the America's Cup on the first challenge. Coutts was later dismissed from the Alinghi team; he fought a court battle with Bertarelli to allow him to sail in the 2007 America's Cup contest in Spain, but reached a settlement that kept him out of that contest. The 2021 America's Cup will be held in Auckland's Waitematā Harbour after New Zealand won the 2017 America's Cup.

Winter sports 

New Zealand has several areas for skiing and snowboarding, on both islands. Whakapapa and Turoa are the only commercial resorts on the North Island; Queenstown, Wanaka and Christchurch are the top locations in the South Island to access the mountains. In addition to the commercial ski resorts, New Zealand has many non-profit club fields across both the North and South Islands, particularly in the region of the Southern Alps close to Christchurch such as Craigieburn Valley, Broken River and Temple Basin. In the North Island, there are club field skiing options on Mount Taranaki at the Manganui area and also on the Eastern aspect of Mount Ruapehu at Tukino.

International snowboarders from New Zealand include Mitch Brown, who placed 25th at the 2006 Winter Olympics in the men's halfpipe, and his sister Kendall Brown, who placed 15th at the 2010 Winter Olympics in the women's halfpipe.  Also New Zealand snowboarder Jacob Koia is currently sitting in 18th position on the TTR world rankings. Notable skiers include Claudia Riegler and Olympic medallist Annelise Coberger.

Softball 
New Zealand's men's softball team, nicknamed the "Black Sox", have been highly successful on the international stage despite the sport being the second most popular summer sport behind cricket in NZ. The Black Sox shared the honours at the World Championships in Lower Hutt in 1976 with the US and Canada, and won outright in 1984, 1996, 2000, 2004, 2013 and 2017. They were the runners up at the 2009 World Champs to Australia. They were 3rd in the inaugural World Championships in Mexico City 1968 ; this team was affectionately known as "The Pilgrims".

The New Zealand women's national softball team are nicknamed the White Sox.  They won the World Championships in 1982.

Squash 

Squash has been played competitively in New Zealand since 1932. In 2010, there were 220 clubs affiliated with the national organisation, Squash New Zealand. Competitions are played at club, regional and national level.

Dame Susan Devoy won the World Open Championship a record four times, in 1985, 1987, 1990, and 1992. She also won seven consecutive British Open titles from 1984 to 1990, and an eighth in 1992.

At the Squash in the 2010 Commonwealth Games, Joelle King and Jaclyn Hawkes won gold in the women's doubles. King and Martin Knight won silver in the mixed doubles.

New Zealand hosted the Women's World Team Championships in 2010. They were held at International Pacific College in Palmerston North.

In the Squash at the 2018 Commonwealth Games, Joelle King won gold in the women's singles and Paul Coll took silver in the men's singles. King won gold again with Amanda Landers-Murphy in women's doubles. King and Coll won bronze in the mixed doubles.

Surfing and surfsport 

Surfing in New Zealand has ahistory dating back as far as 1963, when the first national championships were held at Mount Maunganui and won by Peter Way. Surfing has since become more popular with many New Zealanders competing on the international scene. In 1976, New Zealand hosted the Amco/Radio Hauraki Pro at North Piha which became the first event of the very first year of the World Professional Surfing Tour. The event was won by Michael Peterson. In 1987, Iain Buchanan would go on to compete on the world tour finishing 34th overall, the highest placing ever for a New Zealand surfer. New Zealand's top surfer Maz Quinn at a young age won the Billabong Pro-Junior Series in Australia in 1996, then competed in the World Pro Junior final in France coming second overall to Taj Burrow. Maz Quinn placed 7th on the ASP World Qualifying Series (WQS) in 2001 to qualify for the World Championship Tour (WCT) – the first Kiwi to do so. Woman's surfing has also come far in recent years with New Zealand surfer Paige Hareb currently sitting in 8th position on the ASP World Tour of Surfing.

Surf lifesaving is also popular in New Zealand, with national championships being held yearly.

Quidditch 
Quidditch was introduced to New Zealand around 5 years ago and is currently played mainly at the university level, though some attempts have been made to introduce the under 16 version 'kidditch' to schools. New Zealand is currently listed as an 'emerging area' as there are "more than zero teams but... [no] regular competitive activity". The governing body is QuANZ (Quidditch association of New Zealand) which reports to the IQA (International Quidditch Association). Each year QuANZ hosts an international camp, inviting players from NZ, Australia, and other countries to take part in a 3-day training weekend, held in Christchurch. The national team 'Black Brooms/Tawhai Pango' made their international debut at the 2018 IQA World Cup in Florence, Italy. The team performed better than expected with a final ranking of 20th out of 29 after beating Finland but losing to Malaysia and Germany in pool play, then beating Switzerland and losing a second game against Malaysia. The final game was lost to The Netherlands in the play off for the 19/20 rank. Currently New Zealand's biggest contribution to quidditch as a sport is in overseas leagues where many New Zealanders play for regional teams in Australia and England. The current president of Quidditch UK is NZ born Matthew Bateman.

Tennis 

Tennis was introduced to New Zealand in the 1870s, soon after the modern form of the game was invented in England.

The first New Zealand Tennis Championships were played at Farndon in Hawkes Bay in 1886.

Māori participation in tennis began soon after, with many Māori playing at a high standard by the 1890s. Sir Maui Pomare, the first Māori to qualify as a doctor, won the USA Inter-Varsity Tennis Championships in 1899 while he was studying there. This began a great legacy of Māori participation in tennis, with many players of high calibre emerging over the years, most recently professional players like Kelly Evernden, Rewa Hudson and Leanne Baker. But perhaps the doyenne of Māori tennis was Ruia Morrison, who played with great honour in international competitions, and at Wimbledon, in the early days of the professional era.

New Zealand and Australia, combined as Australasia, were founding members of the International Tennis Federation (ITF) in 1913.

New Zealander Tony Wilding was the World No. 1 player in 1913. He was Wimbledon Champion in 1910, 1911, 1912 and 1913. He was a pivotal figure in helping Australasia win the Davis Cup in 1907, hold it in 1908 and 1909, and to win it again in 1914. He was killed in action during World War I on 9 May 1915 in the Battle of Aubers Ridge, northern France.

New Zealand has competed in the Fed Cup since 1965, when they played Argentina (won 2–1) and Australia (lost 0–3). At a Fed Cup regional tournament held in Christchurch in 2007, New Zealand played Jordan (won 3–0), India (lost 1–2), Chinese Taipei (lost 1–2), Kazakhstan (won 3–0), and Hong Kong (won 2–1).

New Zealand's representatives at the Olympic Games have been: 1912, Stockholm – Tony Wilding (Australasia); 1988, Seoul – Belinda Cordwell and Kelly Evernden (singles) and Bruce Devlin with Kelly Evernden (men's doubles); 1996, Atlanta – Brett Steven; 2008, Beijing – Marina Erakovic.

The Heineken Open is part of the ATP International Series played in Auckland each year, just before the Australian Open.

Triathlon 
Hamish Carter of New Zealand won gold at the 2004 Athens Olympics and bronze at the 2002 Commonwealth Games in Manchester, and was rated world number one for several years. Other successful triathletes from New Zealand include Bevan Docherty, who won the ITU world championship, and a silver in Athens (both in 2004). He has also gained a bronze medal in Beijing 2008, and a silver medal in the Commonwealth Games (Melbourne in 2006).

On the women's side, Samantha Warriner was ranked number 1 in the world. She won silver at the Commonwealth Games in Melbourne in 2006, and Andrea Hewitt took bronze at the same event.

Volleyball 
Volleyball is the second most popular sport for girls in NZ aged 13–18 and sixth for boys. Volleyball has been growing in popularity at school level in recent years especially amongst girls.

The national governing body is Volleyball New Zealand which is made up of 14 Regional Associations. Within each Association there are clubs and/or representative teams. The main events on the calendar each year are the National Secondary Schools Championships and the National Club Championships.

The New Zealand women's national volleyball team won the gold medal on several occasions.

International competitions

Olympic Games 

New Zealanders first competed at the Summer Olympic Games in 1908, with Australia as a combined Australasia team. The New Zealand Olympic Committee was formed in 1911 and was recognised by the IOC in 1919. New Zealand first competed as an independent nation in 1920 and has attended every games since with the exception of the 1980 Moscow games, which New Zealand boycotted (four New Zealand athletes did compete at the 1980 games though under the NZOC flag). The nation first attended the Winter Olympic Games in 1952, and has competed at all but two (1956 and 1964) Winter Olympic Games since.

After the 2018 Winter Olympics, New Zealand as a nation has won 120 medals: 46 gold, 28 silver, and 46 bronze. All but three of those medals were won at the Summer Olympic Games. In addition, three medals, one gold and two bronze, were won by New Zealanders in 1908 and 1912 as part of Australasia. New Zealand ranks 34th on the all-time Olympic Games medal table by total medals, and 29th when weighted by medal type. The most successful sports of New Zealand have been rowing (24 medals, including 11 gold) and athletics (24 medals, including 10 gold).

New Zealand's most celebrated Olympian is probably middle-distance runner Peter Snell, who won three gold medals and broke several world records during the 1960s.

Commonwealth Games 

New Zealand is one of only six nations to have competed at every Commonwealth Games since they were founded as the British Empire Games in 1930. The country has hosted three editions of the games: the 1950 British Empire Games and the 1990 Commonwealth Games in Auckland, and the 1974 British Commonwealth Games in Christchurch.

New Zealand national teams

National team colours 
New Zealand's national sporting colours are black and white (or silver). The silver fern is a national emblem worn by New Zealanders representing their country in sport.

National team names 
The national men's rugby union team is known as the "All Blacks".  The national women's netball team is known as the "Silver Ferns". Historically, rugby and netball dominated team sport in New Zealand, and the national teams of other sports have acquired names which have been formed with reference to these two (see: list below). The women's rugby team is known as the "Black Ferns", rather than the "All Silvers". Some of these names seem to have arisen as genuine nicknames (e.g. "Tall Blacks", "Wheel Blacks"), and some are neologisms developed as marketing devices (e.g. Black Sticks (hockey), Black Caps (cricket)). New Zealand Badminton temporarily named their teams "Black Cocks". The men's national soccer team is called the "All Whites", as they play in an all-white strip. At the time the national soccer team was formed, an all-black strip would not have been allowed.

Two notable exceptions to the "Black/Ferns" naming scheme are the "Kiwis" (men's Rugby League) and "SWANZ" (the name formerly used for women's soccer).

Notes

References 

https://www.stuff.co.nz/.../basketball/.../basketball-increasing-as-sport-of- choice-among-new-zealand-youth
Retrieved 19 July 2017

External links 
 Participation in Sport URL accessed on 23 January 2006
 Top Sports and Physical Activities URL accessed on 23 January 2006
 SPARC Facts complete (pdf) URL accessed on 23 January 2006
 New Zealand Orienteering Federation URL accessed on 23 January 2006